Iselin  is an unincorporated community and census-designated place (CDP) located within Woodbridge Township, in Middlesex County, New Jersey. As of the 2010 United States Census, the CDP's population was 18,695.

Previously known as Perrytown and Unionville, Iselin received its current name after New York investment banker and philanthropist Adrian Georg Iselin, who established a finishing school in the 1870s for girls from wealthy New York families there. Iselin additionally subsidized the erection of a new train station which was replaced by a newer station to the south known as Metropark. The largest bordering town of Iselin is Edison.

Geography
According to the United States Census Bureau, the CDP had a total area of 3.190 square miles (8.263 km2), including 3.189 square miles (8.261 km2) of land and 0.001 square miles (0.003 km2) of water (0.03%).

Downtown area 
Iselin's downtown is centered on Little India (also known as "Oak Tree Road"), bound by the Garden State Parkway to the West, and Route 27 (Lincoln Highway) to the East. Once home to a wide array of shops, eateries, services, and complemented by a single-screen 1920s movie palace, the area was in obvious decline in the 1980s. An influx of Asian-Indian immigration beginning in the early 1990s led to the area's revitalization. Formerly vacant stores were tenanted, and additional retail spaces built as the area became known for its high quality Indian food, sweets, clothing (particularly saris), jewelry, music, and other goods.

Metropark 

An area known as Metropark, consisting primarily of office parks and large office buildings, lies in the southwestern corner of Iselin and spills over into neighboring Edison. The New Jersey Transit and Amtrak Metropark Station is named for this area.

In addition to a Hilton Hotel (now known as Hotel Woodbridge at Metropark) and the train station, Metropark also features the headquarters of Ansell Limited, Engelhard Corporation (acquired by BASF in 2006) and Eaton Corporation's Filtration Division. Other corporate residents in the area include Siemens, Tata Consultancy Services, Mott MacDonald, Ernst & Young, Mizuho, Wells Fargo, JPMorgan Chase, Accenture, Level 3 Communications, BT Group, UBS, Anthem, Teachers Insurance and Annuity Association of America, Ansell, and EisnerAmper.

Demographics

2010 Census

2000 Census
As of the 2000 United States Census there were 16,698 people, 6,007 households, and 4,511 families residing in the CDP. The population density was 2,059.8/km2 (5,327.6/mi2). There were 6,137 housing units at an average density of 757.0/km2 (1,958.0/mi2). The racial makeup of the CDP was 64.65% White, 6.02% African American, 0.12% Native American, 25.16% Asian, 0.01% Pacific Islander, 1.75% from other races, and 2.28% from two or more races. Hispanic or Latino of any race were 5.47% of the population.

There were 6,007 households, out of which 32.0% had children under the age of 18 living with them, 61.5% were married couples living together, 9.8% had a female householder with no husband present, and 24.9% were non-families. 20.8% of all households were made up of individuals, and 8.6% had someone living alone who was 65 years of age or older. The average household size was 2.78 and the average family size was 3.24.

In the CDP the population was spread out, with 21.8% under the age of 18, 7.6% from 18 to 24, 33.9% from 25 to 44, 22.7% from 45 to 64, and 14.0% who were 65 years of age or older. The median age was 37 years. For every 100 females, there were 96.8 males. For every 100 females age 18 and over, there were 95.1 males.

The median income for a household in the CDP was $65,424, and the median income for a family was $71,913. Males had a median income of $50,145 versus $36,131 for females. The per capita income for the CDP was $26,793. About 1.9% of families and 3.2% of the population were below the poverty line, including 2.8% of those under age 18 and 4.9% of those age 65 or over.

South Asian community 
Iselin hosts one of the region's main centers of Indian American cultural diversity. The growing Little India is a South Asian-focused commercial strip in Middlesex County, the U.S. county with the highest concentration of Asian Indians. The Oak Tree Road strip runs for about one-and-a-half miles through Iselin and neighboring Edison Township, near the area's sprawling Chinatown and Koreatown, running along New Jersey Route 27. The zone is the largest and most diverse South Asian cultural hub in the United States. In Middlesex County, election ballots are printed in English, Spanish, Gujarati, Hindi, and Punjabi. According to the 2017 American Community Survey, 42.6% of Iselin residents identified themselves as being Indian American, the highest percentage for any census-designated place in the United States.

Education
Iselin public school students attend the schools of the Woodbridge Township School District. Elementary Schools #18, #24 and #26 are located in Iselin as well as Iselin Middle School (nicknamed the Panthers) and John F. Kennedy Memorial High School (nicknamed the Mustangs).

Notable people

People who were born in, residents of, or otherwise closely associated with Iselin include:
 Tom DeSanto (born 1968), film producer and screenwriter best known for his work with long-time friend Bryan Singer, especially with his contributions to the first two X-Men movies.
 Robbie E (born 1983), professional wrestler with Impact Wrestling on POP TV.
 Chris Smith (New Jersey politician) (born 1953), U.S. Representative for New Jersey's 4th congressional district since 1981.
 James Swann (born 1964), serial killer whose random drive-by shotgun shootings in Washington, D.C. in 1993 earned him the nickname "The Shotgun Stalker" in the press.

See also
List of neighborhoods in Woodbridge Township, New Jersey
List of neighborhoods in Edison, New Jersey

References

Neighborhoods in Woodbridge Township, New Jersey
Census-designated places in Middlesex County, New Jersey